Novooskolsky District is an administrative district (raion), one of the twenty-one in Belgorod Oblast, Russia. Municipally, it is incorporated as Novooskolsky Municipal District. It is located in the center of the oblast. Its administrative center is the town of Novy Oskol. Population:  47,380 (2002 Census);  The population of Novy Oskol accounts for 45.0% of the district's total population.

References

Notes

Sources

Districts of Belgorod Oblast